Mokopuna (the 'grandchild') Island is a small island in Wellington Harbour, New Zealand.

A number of wave-cut arches and caves line the shore. Today, Mokopuna is a bird reserve where gulls and blue penguins nest and where no landings are allowed.

History 
Mokopuna Island was known for many years as Leper Island. For about three months in 1904, one of the caves on the island was the home of one Kim Lee, a Cantonese fruiterer who had been diagnosed—possibly mistakenly—as a leper.  Although Matiu / Somes was the human quarantine station at the time, Lee was exiled to Mokopuna, where he was supplied with food and water by a flying fox from Matiu / Somes. Lee died on Mokopuna on 14 March 1904 and was buried on Matiu / Somes. The name Mokopuna Island was restored in August 1947 after a request from the Wellington Beautifying Society to the Geographic Board of the Lands and Survey Department.

Six tuatara were released on Mokopuna Island by the Department of Internal Affairs in April 1920 and thought to still be there in 1935 though none were seen. In November 1947 a member of the public reported that rabbits were numerous on Mokopuna Island, having been let loose there by an unknown person. The rabbits were causing extensive damage to the local plant life, ringbarking trees and eating other plants, and degradation of the plant cover was causing soil erosion. A poisoning operation killed 101 rabbits in three days. Further extermination of rabbits was carried out, and by late 1951 the island's vegetation had begun to regenerate.

See also

 List of islands of New Zealand
 List of islands
 Desert island

References

Further reading 
 McGill, D., The Pioneers of Port Nicholson, 1984, A. H. & A. W. Reed, Wellington, N. Z. 

Uninhabited islands of New Zealand
Wellington Harbour
Islands of the Wellington Region